John Crichton-Stuart, 5th Marquess of Bute (4 August 1907 – 14 August 1956) was the son of John Crichton-Stuart, 4th Marquess of Bute, and Augusta Bellingham.

Marriage and children
On 26 April 1932, he married Lady Eileen Beatrice Forbes (1912–1993), a daughter of Bernard Forbes, 8th Earl of Granard by his wife Beatrice Mills Forbes, an American socialite who was the daughter of Ogden Mills. They had four children:
 John Crichton-Stuart, 6th Marquess of Bute (27 February 1933 – 22 July 1993) 
 Lord David Crichton-Stuart (27 February 1933 – 1977) 
 Lord James Crichton-Stuart (17 September 1935 – 5 December 1982). He married and divorced the fashion model Sarah Frances Croker-Poole, who later married the Muslim religious leader Aga Khan IV, converted to Islam, took the name 'Salimah Aga Khan' and became the mother of three children by the Aga Khan, including his probable heir, Rahim Aga Khan.
 Lady Caroline Moira Fiona Crichton-Stuart (born 7 January 1941)

Interests
The Marquess was an expert ornithologist; in 1931 he bought the islands of St Kilda to preserve them as a bird sanctuary, leaving them to the National Trust for Scotland in 1956.

In 1953, the Marchioness of Bute and Lady St David's Fund was set up to encourage and support women to train as nurses and midwives in south Wales.

See also
Falkland Palace

References

External links

1907 births
1956 deaths
5
Vice-Lieutenants of Buteshire
Scottish ornithologists
20th-century British zoologists